Princessa is a Polish chocolate bar manufactured by Nestlé, consisting of a chocolate-covered wafer bar with four layers of wafer, and three layers of filling. They are similar to the longer-established rival product Prince Polo, and have been released in several different varieties over the years.

History
The Princessa brand was first introduced by the company Goplana S.A., which is based in Poznań, Greater Poland. In 1994 Goplana, Poland's largest chocolate company at the time, was acquired by Nestlé with the aim of introducing the Nestlé brand to the Polish market. In 2004, Nestlé sold Goplana to the company Jutrzenka Holding S.A. (now Colian Holding S.A.), leaving Nestlé with the rights to manufacture products under the Princessa brand.

Varieties
Nestlé produces the Princessa chocolate bar in many varieties, including:
 Princessa Mleczna
 Princessa Klasyczna
 Princessa Arachidowa
 Princessa Zebra
 Princessa Orzechowa
 Princessa Kokosowa
 Princessa Kokosowa Biała
 Princessa Czekoladowa
 Princessa Muśnięta Czekoladą
 Princessa Intensywny Smak Brownie

Special editions include:
 Princessa Gold
 Princessa Bananowym Milkshake
 Princessa Truskawkowa Milkshake
 Princessa Intense Peanut Butter
 Princessa Intense White Coconut
 Princessa Intense Dark Coconut
 Princessa Dark Orange
 Princessa Dark Cherry
 Princessa White Raspberry
 Princessa White Lemon
 Princessa Salty Caramel (Planeta Singli Edition)

The chocolate bars are also available in maxi/longa varieties, which are longer versions of the bar, chrupka varieties, which contain more wafer and less chocolate, and vitale varieties which are coated in a light layer of grains.

Also available under the Princessa brand is Princessa ice cream and Princessa waffles.

See also
 List of Polish desserts

References

External links
www.nestle.com (Polish)

Chocolate bars
Polish desserts
Polish brands
Brand name confectionery